Quinnia limatula is a species of extremely small deep water sea snail, a marine gastropod mollusk in the family Seguenziidae.

Description
The length of the species attains 5.4 mm.

Distribution
This marine species occurs off New Caledonia and Ouvea, Loyalty Islands.

References

External links
  Marshall B.A. (1991). Mollusca Gastropoda : Seguenziidae from New Caledonia and the Loyalty Islands. In A. Crosnier & P. Bouchet (Eds) Résultats des campagnes Musorstom, vol. 7. Mémoires du Muséum National d'Histoire Naturelle, A, 150:41-109
 To Encyclopedia of Life
 To World Register of Marine Species

limatula
Gastropods described in 1991